Pterolophia simulans is a species of beetle in the family Cerambycidae. It was described by Stephan von Breuning and de Jong in 1941. It is known from Java and Borneo.

References

simulans
Beetles described in 1941